The 1907–08 Cornell Big Red men's ice hockey season was the 7th season of play for the program.

Season
Cornell doubled its number of games from the previous season, playing two at home and two on the road. For the second straight season the Big Red didn't surrender a single goal to their opponents while scoring 21 times over the course of four games.

The team did not have a head coach but Jefferson Vincent served as team manager.

Roster

Standings

Schedule and Results

|-
!colspan=12 style=";" | Regular Season

References

Cornell Big Red men's ice hockey seasons
Cornell
Cornell
Cornell
Cornell